The W85 was a thermonuclear warhead developed by the United States of America to arm the Pershing II missile.

Overview
The Pershing Ia missile was armed with a  W50 warhead. By the early 1970s, it was clear that this was far too large to allow the missile to be used as a tactical nuclear weapon—at the time, 400 kilotons was larger than many strategic warheads. The Pershing II had a high-accuracy maneuverable reentry vehicle (MARV) equipped with a radar terminal guidance system, which allowed it to use the lower-yield W85 warhead. This warhead was derived from the B61 Mod 3 and utilized the same pit in the primary stage of the warhead, but it has also been described as having a nuclear design similar to that of the B61-4.

In 1987 a joint Army/Department of Energy study concluded that it was technically and financially feasible to replace the W50 warhead carried by Pershing 1a with the W85 warhead developed for Pershing II. However, with the signing of the Intermediate-Range Nuclear Forces Treaty, development on the conversion was terminated.

After the Pershing missiles were scrapped, all of the W85 warheads produced were modified into B61 Mod 10 bombs. 215 W85 warheads were manufactured.

References

Nuclear warheads of the United States
Military equipment introduced in the 1980s